The Republican Fusion (FR), also previously referred to as Republican Union (UR) and Republican Coalition (CR), was a Spanish electoral alliance initially created for the 1886 Spanish general election and rearranged for the elections of 1893, 1898, 1899 and, within the wider Republican Coalition, also for the 1901 election.

Composition
Republican Union (1886–1889)

Republican Coalition (1891–1893)

Republican Union (1893–1897)

Republican Fusion (1897–1903)

References

See also
 Liberalism and radicalism in Spain

Defunct political parties in Spain
Political parties established in 1886
Political parties disestablished in 1903
1886 establishments in Spain
1903 disestablishments in Spain
Radical parties
Republican parties in Spain